Thiruvavaduthurai is a village in Mayiladuthurai district, east-central Tamil Nadu, South India, where the Masilamaniswara Temple is located. Thiruvaduthurai Adheenam, one of the prominent Saiva Aadheenams (monasteries) in South India, is located adjacent to the temple complex.

Cities and towns in Mayiladuthurai district